Podgorje may refer to:

 Podgorje, Apače, a village in Slovenia
 Podgorje, Kamnik, a village in Slovenia
 Podgorje, Koper, a village in Slovenia
 Podgorje, Slovenj Gradec, a village in Slovenia
 Podgorje, Velenje, a village in Slovenia
 Podgorje (Banovići), a village in Bosnia and Herzegovina
 Podgorje, Bileća, a village in Bosnia and Herzegovina
 Podgorje, Mostar, a village in Bosnia and Herzegovina
 Podgorje (Višegrad), a village in Bosnia and Herzegovina
 Podgorje, Virovitica-Podravina County, a village near Virovitica, Croatia
 , a village near Orebić, Croatia
 Podgorje, Sisak-Moslavina County, a village near Gvozd, Croatia
 Podgorje Bistričko, a village in Croatia
 Podgorje ob Sevnični, a dispersed settlement in Slovenia
 Podgorje pod Čerinom, a village in Slovenia
 Podgorje pri Letušu, a village in Slovenia
 Podgorje pri Pišecah, a village in Slovenia